Peter Newman may refer to:

Peter C. Newman (born 1929), Canadian journalist who emigrated from Nazi-occupied Czechoslovakia
Peter Kenneth Newman (1928–2001), English economist, historian of economic thought
Peter R. Newman (1926–1975), British writer
Peter Newman (environmental scientist) (born 1945), writer on urban planning and sustainability
Peter Newman (actor) (born 1942), American actor best known for his voice-over work for Rankin-Bass
Peter Newman (film producer), American film producer
Peter Newman (tennis), Australian tennis player of the 1950s, see 1958 Wimbledon Championships – Men's Singles
Peter Newman (author), English author of fantasy novels and short stories
Peter Anim Newman (1890–1984), Ghanaian religious leader

See also
Peter Neumann (disambiguation)